Jonathan George "Jonty" Farmer (born 23 April 1945) is a retired sailor who represented New Zealand at the 1968 and 1976 Summer Olympics.

Farmer was born in 1945 in Te Puke in the Bay of Plenty. He later lived in Rotorua and received his education at Rotorua Boys' High School. He competed at the 1968 Summer Olympics in Mexico City in the Finn class and came 11th. He travelled to the 1972 Summer Olympics in Germany as a reserve but did not compete. He then competed at the 1976 Summer Olympics in Montreal, Canada, in the Finn class and came 15th.

His daughter, Holly Farmer, is a boat builder in Tauranga.

References

1945 births
Living people
Olympic sailors of New Zealand
New Zealand male sailors (sport)
Sailors at the 1968 Summer Olympics – Finn
Sailors at the 1976 Summer Olympics – Finn
People from Te Puke
People educated at Rotorua Boys' High School
Sportspeople from the Bay of Plenty Region